Security engineering is the process of incorporating security controls into an information system so that the controls become an integral part of the system’s operational capabilities. It is similar to other systems engineering activities in that its primary motivation is to support the delivery of engineering solutions that satisfy pre-defined functional and user requirements, but it has the added dimension of preventing misuse and malicious behavior. Those constraints and restrictions are often asserted as a security policy.

In one form or another, security engineering has existed as an informal field of study for several centuries. For example, the fields of locksmithing and security printing have been around for many years. The concerns for modern security engineering and computer systems were first solidified in a RAND paper from 1967, "Security and Privacy in Computer Systems" by Willis H. Ware. This paper, later expanded in 1979,  provided many of the fundamental information security concepts, labelled today as Cybersecurity, that impact modern computer systems, from cloud implementations to embedded IoT.

Recent catastrophic events, most notably 9/11, have made security engineering quickly become a rapidly-growing field. In fact, in a report completed in 2006, it was estimated that the global security industry was valued at US $150 billion.

Security engineering involves aspects of social science, psychology (such as designing a system to "fail well", instead of trying to eliminate all sources of error), and economics as well as physics, chemistry, mathematics, criminology architecture, and landscaping.
Some of the techniques used, such as fault tree analysis, are derived from safety engineering.

Other techniques such as cryptography were previously restricted to military applications. One of the pioneers of establishing security engineering as a formal field of study is Ross Anderson.

Qualifications
No single qualification exists to become a security engineer.

However, an undergraduate and/or graduate degree, often in computer science, computer engineering, or physical protection focused degrees such as Security Science, in combination with practical work experience (systems, network engineering, software development, physical protection system modelling etc.) most qualifies an individual to succeed in the field. Other degree qualifications with a security focus exist. Multiple certifications, such as the Certified Information Systems Security Professional, or Certified Physical Security Professional are available that may demonstrate expertise in the field. Regardless of the qualification, the course must include a knowledge base to diagnose the security system drivers, security theory and principles including defense in depth, protection in depth, situational crime prevention and crime prevention through environmental design to set the protection strategy (professional inference), and technical knowledge including physics and mathematics to design and commission the engineering treatment solution. A security engineer can also benefit from having knowledge in cyber security and information security. Any previous work experience related to privacy and computer science is also valued. 

All of this knowledge must be braced by professional attributes including strong communication skills and high levels of literacy for engineering report writing. Security engineering also goes by the label Security Science.

Related-fields
 Information security

See esp. Computer security
protecting data from unauthorized access, use, disclosure, destruction, modification, or disruption to access.

 Physical security
deter attackers from accessing a facility, resource, or information stored on physical media.
 Technical surveillance counter-measures
 Economics of security
the economic aspects of economics of privacy and computer security.

Methodologies
Technological advances, principally in the field of computers, have now allowed the creation of far more complex systems, with new and complex security problems. Because modern systems cut across many areas of human endeavor, security engineers not only need consider the mathematical and physical properties of systems; they also need to consider attacks on the people who use and form parts of those systems using social engineering attacks. Secure systems have to resist not only technical attacks, but also coercion, fraud, and deception by confidence tricksters.

Web applications
According to the Microsoft Developer Network the patterns and practices of security engineering consist of the following activities:
 Security Objectives
 Security Design Guidelines
 Security Modeling
 Security Architecture and Design Review
 Security Code Review
 Security Testing
 Security Tuning
 Security Deployment Review
These activities are designed to help meet security objectives in the software life cycle.

Physical

 Understanding of a typical threat and the usual risks to people and property.
 Understanding the incentives created both by the threat and the countermeasures.
 Understanding risk and threat analysis methodology and the benefits of an empirical study of the physical security of a facility.
 Understanding how to apply the methodology to buildings, critical infrastructure, ports, public transport and other facilities/compounds.
 Overview of common physical and technological methods of protection and understanding their roles in deterrence, detection and mitigation.
 Determining and prioritizing security needs and aligning them with the perceived threats and the available budget.

Product
Product security engineering is security engineering applied specifically to the products that an organization creates, distributes, and/or sells. Product security engineering is distinct from corporate/enterprise security, which focuses on securing corporate networks and systems that an organization uses to conduct business.

Product security includes security engineering applied to:
 Hardware devices such as cell phones, computers, Internet of things devices, and cameras.
 Software such as operating systems, applications, and firmware.

Such security engineers are often employed in separate teams from corporate security teams and work closely with product engineering teams.

Target hardening
Whatever the target, there are multiple ways of preventing penetration by unwanted or unauthorized persons. Methods include placing Jersey barriers, stairs or other sturdy obstacles outside tall or politically sensitive buildings to prevent car and truck bombings. Improving the method of visitor management and some new electronic locks take advantage of technologies such as fingerprint scanning, iris or retinal scanning, and voiceprint identification to authenticate users.

See also

Computer-related
 Authentication
 Cryptanalysis
 Data remanence
 Defensive programming (secure coding)
 Earthquake engineering
 Economics of security
 Engineering Product Lifecycle
 Explosion protection
 Password policy
 Secure coding
 Security hacker
 Security pattern
 Security Requirements Analysis
 Security testing
 Software cracking
 Software security assurance
 Systems engineering
 Trusted system

Physical
 Access control
 Authorization
 Critical infrastructure protection
 Environmental design (esp. CPTED)
 Mantrap
 Physical security
 Secrecy
 Secure cryptoprocessor
 Security through obscurity

Misc. Topics
 Full disclosure (computer security)
 Security awareness
 Security community
 Steganography
 Kerckhoffs's principle

References

Further reading

Articles and papers
 patterns & practices Security Engineering on Channel9
 patterns & practices Security Engineering on MSDN
 patterns & practices Security Engineering Explained
 Basic Target Hardening from the Government of South Australia